The Lonely H was an American rock band from Port Angeles, Washington. The band formed in the early 2000s while the members, Mark Fredson (Vox, Keys), Eric Whitman (Guitar), Ben Eyestone (Drums), and Johnny Whitman (Bass), were still in high school.
In 2006, the group released its debut album with The Control Group, Kick Upstairs, to critical acclaim. They subsequently released their second full-length album, Hair. Their third album, Concrete Class, was released in June 2009. After  
touring extensively from July 2007 through March 2010, The band relocated to Nashville, TN for a more central location and to make records.

Once they moved to Nashville, the band was joined by Zach Setchfield. They began working on their latest album, self-titled The Lonely H. The album debuted on iTunes in June 2013 to rave reviews and is available for download.

Discography
 Kick Upstairs (The Control Group - 2006)
 Hair (TCG - 2007)
 Concrete Class (TCG - 2009)
 The Lonely H (CEN/Self-released - 2013)

References

External links
 The Lonely H's Myspace
 The Control Group Artist Page
 The Lonely H's Facebook Page

Rock music groups from Washington (state)
Musical groups established in 2003